Bridge No. L1409, also known as the Garvin Brook Bridge, was a historic stone arch bridge in Hillsdale Township, Minnesota, United States, built in 1895.  However it was largely destroyed during the 2007 Midwest flooding, when runoff carried away everything except the arch substructure.  It had been listed on the National Register of Historic Places in 1990 for having state-level significance in the theme of engineering.  It was nominated for being Minnesota's "most impressive" rural stone arch bridge, owing to its fine ashlar masonry and sizeable  span. The bridge has been replaced by a modern structure.  It was officially delisted from the National Register in 2016.

History

Residents of Hillsdale Township petitioned Winona County for a bridge at this location in September 1894.  Initially tabled, the request was later approved and plans were drafted by county surveyor Fred H. Pickles.  The project went out for contract in October 1895 and local stonemason Charles Butler—with the lowest bid at $1,340—was selected.  The bridge was largely completed by December of that year.

Bridge No. L1409 was among a concentration of rural stone arch bridges in Southeast Minnesota built in the late 19th and early 20th centuries. Most of these were built by local governments in response to the Good Roads Movement. L1409 was three times that length, and with the fine masonry produced by Butler, it was comparable to the larger and more sophisticated bridges of Minnesota's urban areas.

In the summer of 2007, extreme flooding in Southeast Minnesota sent torrents of water sweeping down Garvin Brook.  L1409's spandrel walls and earth fill were torn away, though the stone arch was so sturdily built it held in place.  However the bridge was essentially destroyed, and it has since been replaced with a modern structure.

See also
 List of bridges on the National Register of Historic Places in Minnesota
 National Register of Historic Places listings in Winona County, Minnesota

References

1895 establishments in Minnesota
Bridges completed in 1895
Buildings and structures demolished in 2007
Demolished bridges in the United States
Demolished buildings and structures in Minnesota
Former National Register of Historic Places in Minnesota
Former road bridges in Minnesota
National Register of Historic Places in Winona County, Minnesota
Road bridges on the National Register of Historic Places in Minnesota
L1409
Buildings and structures destroyed by flooding